Dario Kofilovski is a Macedonian handball player that plays for RK Metalurg Skopje. His position is Left wing and he is considered as the future of the HC Metalurg .

References

Macedonian male handball players
2000 births
Living people